The 2012 Shoot-Out is an annual curling bonspiel that was held from September 13-16, 2012 at the Saville Sports Centre in Edmonton, Alberta as part of the 2012–13 World Curling Tour. The purses for the men's and women's events were CAD$22,000 and CAD$20,000, with teams Jamie King and Kaitlyn Lawes winning their respective events.

Men

Teams

Round-robin standings

Playoffs

Women

Teams

* Kerri Einarson is filling in for Sasha Carter

Knockout Brackets

A Event

B Event

C Event

Playoffs

External links
Event Host Site: Saville Sports Centre

The Shoot-Out
The Shoot-Out